Pseudarchaster myobrachius is a species of starfish.

References

Pseudarchasteridae
Animals described in 1906